The Facts of Murder (Italian: Un maledetto imbroglio)  is a 1959 Italian crime film mystery directed by and starring Pietro Germi with Claudia Cardinale. The film is based on the 1957 novel That Awful Mess on Via Merulana by Carlo Emilio Gadda. The sets were designed by the art director Carlo Egidi.

It was restored and re-released in 1999 both in Italy and the United States.

Plot
A disguised bandit steals valuable jewellery from Commendatore Anzaloni's apartment and flees, leaving Anzaloni unharmed. Inspector Ingravallo investigates and finds that the robbery is suspicious in that the robber was able to find valuables too quickly. A neighbour, Liliana Banducci, employs a servant girl, Assuntina. Her fiancé, Diomede, tries to escape when he sees police tailing Assuntina. But Diomede has an alibi. Liliana's cousin, Dr. Valdarena, pays her a visit, only to find her corpse on the floor. But before calling police, Valdarena removes an envelope addressed to him from the sideboard. Liliana's husband Remo was away from Rome at the time of the murder, but he is very surprised to hear that Liliana had changed her will only one week earlier.

Cast
Pietro Germi as Inspector Ciccio Ingravallo
Claudia Cardinale as Assuntina
Franco Fabrizi as Valdarena
Cristina Gaioni as Virginia
Claudio Gora as Remo Banducci
Eleonora Rossi Drago as Liliana Banducci
Saro Urzì as Detective Saro
Nino Castelnuovo as Diomede
Ildebrando Santafe as Anzaloni
Peppino De Martino as  Dr. Fumi
Silla Bettini as Oreste

Awards
 Mar de Plata Film Festival : Best Director
 Nastro d'Argento : Best Script, Best Supporting Actor (Claudio Gora ).

References

Bibliography 
 Moliterno, Gino. A to Z of Italian Cinema. Scarecrow Press, 2009.

External links
 

1959 films
1950s Italian-language films
Italian black-and-white films
Films set in Italy
Italian heist films
1959 crime films
1950s mystery films
Films directed by Pietro Germi
Films scored by Carlo Rustichelli
1950s heist films
1950s Italian films